In algebraic geometry, Kleiman's theorem, introduced by , concerns dimension and smoothness of scheme-theoretic intersection after some perturbation of factors in the intersection.

Precisely, it states: given a connected algebraic group G acting transitively on an algebraic variety X over an algebraically closed field k and  morphisms of varieties, G contains a nonempty open subset such that for each g in the set,
 (Kleiman–Bertini theorem) If  are smooth varieties and if the characteristic of the base field k is zero, then  is smooth.

Statement 1 establishes a version of Chow's moving lemma: after some perturbation of cycles on X, their intersection has expected dimension.

Sketch of proof 

Let  be the composition that is  followed by the group action .

.
Let  be the projection. It is surjective since  acts transitively on X. Each fiber of p is a coset of stabilizers on X and so
.
This completes the proof of Statement 1.

For Statement 2, since G acts transitively on X and the smooth locus of X is nonempty (by characteristic zero), X itself is smooth. Since G is smooth, each geometric fiber of p is smooth and thus  is a smooth morphism.

Notes

References

 

Algebraic geometry